Where Horses Go to Die is a French film directed by Antony Hickling in 2016. The film had a cinema release at St André des Arts cinema in Paris, France 2016.

Plot
Visual artist, Daniel wanders the night in search of inspiration. In the midst of reveries and fantasies, he will cross paths with Manuela, Divine and Candice, three nocturnal angels who will take him on a journey to the end of desire.

Cast
 Jean-Christophe Bouvet as Daniel
 Manuel Blanc as Manuela / Marco
 Amanda Dawson as Candice
 Walter Dickerson as Divine
 Luc Bruyere as Mohammed

Awards

The Trilogy ( Where Horses Go To Die, Little Gay Boy, & Frig) receives the Christian Petermann award for an innovative work. Controversial scenarios expressed through music, dance and daring at the IV DIGO – Goias Sexual diversity and gender international Film Festival, Brazil, 2019
Special Mention for his work as a director at Rio FICG, Brazil, 2015

References

External links
 

2016 films
Films set in Paris
French LGBT-related films
2010s French films